The Ohio Building is a  tall high-rise building located at 420 Madison Avenue in Downtown Toledo.

History 
The twelve story structure was constructed in 1906 by the Ohio Savings Bank and Trust Company at the corner of Madison Avenue and Superior Street in Toledo's business center. The building was described in 1910 as "one of the finest structures in the state". The building was designed by George S. Mills, who moved his architectural offices into the finished structure upon its completion.

See also
List of tallest buildings in Toledo, Ohio

References 

Buildings and structures in Toledo, Ohio
Office buildings completed in 1906
Neoclassical architecture in Ohio
1906 establishments in Ohio